The Society for the History of Astronomy is an organisation based in the United Kingdom that promotes research into the history of astronomy. It publishes a research journal called The Antiquarian Astronomer and a regular Bulletin.

The society
The Society for the History of Astronomy was founded in 2002 to promote the study of the history of astronomy by hosting talks by members and publishing new research into the field. One main objective was to encourage research into past astronomers who have previously been neglected within the history of science. Some of its members are professional historians of science but most are amateur historians.

The honorary president is Dr Allan Chapman of Wadham College, Oxford. The honorary vice-presidents are Emily Winterburn (who was chair at the time of foundation) and Prof. Mike Edmunds. Previous vice-presidents have included Sir Patrick Moore, Sir Arnold Wolfendale, FRS, and Dr Michael Hoskin.

The society hosts several one-day conferences at venues across the United Kingdom each year. A Bulletin is published twice yearly containing articles and news items about astronomical history. The Bulletin includes short reports of original research by members.

The society maintains a library of publications of importance to the history of the science. The reference section is named for Sir Robert Ball and the lending section is named for Sir Patrick Moore. The library is located at the Birmingham and Midland Institute in central Birmingham. The archives of the society are preserved at the library of the Institute of Astronomy, Cambridge.

Survey of Astronomical History
One of the society's major activities is organising a Survey of Astronomical History in the form of lists of historical astronomers and observatories in each of the old counties of Britain and Ireland. This has been motivated by a desire to promote research into local astronomical activities that have previously been neglected.

The Antiquarian Astronomer
The society publishes annually a refereed journal called The Antiquarian Astronomer containing new research into the history of astronomy, particularly articles written by members. Published papers have discussed activities in major observatories, scientific research by individuals of particular note, scientific instrument makers, and the activities of prominent amateur astronomers.

The first issue appeared in 2004, and issue 10 was published in 2016. Back issues are indexed in the SAO/NASA Astrophysics Data System (ADS), and the ADS contains scans of all articles published during the period 2004–2016. Its current editor is Ian Ridpath.

Society for the History of Astronomy Bulletin
The society publishes an bi-annual Bulletin containing news relating to the study of the history of astronomy and the organisation's activities. The Bulletin also includes short research articles and notes by members. It was previously called News (editions 1–4, 2002–2004) and Newsletter (editions 5–17, 2004–2008). Articles are indexed in the SAO/NASA Astrophysics Data System but scans are not currently available. Digital versions are available online for some editions. The current editors are Carolyn Kennett and Len Adam.

Chairs

Picnics 

One feature of this society is an annual summer picnic. Past picnics have been held at:-

5 July 2003 Wadham College, Oxford

3 July 2004 Woolsthorpe Manor

6 August 2005 Wadham College, Oxford

8 July 2006 ‘Farthings’, Selsey

16 June 2007 Pendrell Hall, Staffordshire

2 August 2008 Marlborough College, Wiltshire

4 July 2009 Hanwell Community Observatory

17 July 2010 Stonyhurst College

16 July 2011 Orwell Park, Suffolk

9 June 2012 Carr House, Much Hoole

29 June 2013 Mill Hill Observatory

12 July 2014 National Maritime Museum, Greenwich

4 July 2015 Woolsthorpe Manor

2 July 2016 Hanwell Community Observatory

1 July 2017 Liverpool City Centre

30 June 2018 Seething Observatory, Norwich

29 June 2019 Norman Lockyer Observatory, Sidmouth, Devon

2020 and 2021 no picnic held

25 June 2022 19 New King Street, Bath (to coincide with the bi-centenary of the death of William Herschel)

See also 
 List of astronomical societies

References

External links
 Society for the History of Astronomy – Official Website
 Survey of Astronomical History of Britain and Ireland
 Astrophysics Data System index to The Antiquarian Astronomer with scans
 Astrophysics Data System index to the Newsletter and Bulletin
 Digital archive of the Newsletter and Bulletin

British astronomy organisations
Learned societies of the United Kingdom
Organizations established in 2002
2002 establishments in the United Kingdom
History of science organizations
Historical societies of the United Kingdom